Thomas Aylesbury may refer to:

 Sir Thomas Aylesbury, 1st Baronet (1576–1657), English civil servant
Thomas Aylesbury (theologian) ( 1622–1659), English theologian